Pedro Julio Feliz (born April 27, 1975), is a Dominican former professional baseball third baseman, who played in Major League Baseball (MLB) for the San Francisco Giants, Philadelphia Phillies, Houston Astros, and St. Louis Cardinals.

Feliz hit 20 or more home runs in four of his first five seasons as a starting third baseman and was an above-average fielder at that position.

Baseball career

Minor leagues

Feliz was signed by the San Francisco Giants, as an amateur free agent, on February 7, 1994. He spent parts of seven seasons in the Giants' farm system before being called up to the Giants when the rosters expanded, in September 2000.

San Francisco Giants

Feliz played for the Giants from 2000 to 2007 and was their only homegrown position player, from  through 2007. Feliz filled in for regular Edgardo Alfonzo for 51 games at third base, spelled J. T. Snow for 70 games at first base, appeared in 20 games at shortstop, and played four games in the outfield. With the bat, Feliz posted career highs in  batting average (BA) (.276), HR (22), runs batted in (RBI) (84), at-bats (AB) (603), and games played (G) (144), that season.

Feliz had moved around defensively throughout his early big league career, especially during the Giants' injury-riddled  season. By 2007, he had settled into the role of the Giants' starting third baseman.

Although Feliz was a decent power hitter, his career batting average prior to the  season was only .255, and he seldom walked, as evidenced by his on-base percentage (OBP) never surpassing the .305 mark, and his OPS never exceeding .793. He has often been criticized for his lack of patience at the plate. In 2006, Feliz struck out a career-high 112 times.

On June 8, 2007, in a game against the Oakland Athletics, Feliz played catcher for the first time in his major league career. During that game, the Giants' starting catcher Bengie Molina was lifted from the game, as part of a double switch. Their backup catcher, Eliézer Alfonzo, was injured on a play at the plate and had to leave the game, in the 10th inning. With the Giants out of position players, Feliz moved to catcher, Randy Winn moved from center field to third, Dan Ortmeier moved from right field to center, and pitcher Noah Lowry came into the game in right. After the season, Feliz was honored with a Fielding Bible Award as the best fielding third baseman in MLB in 2007.

Following the 2007 season, Felix sought a 3-year contract extension from the Giants, as his previous contract had come to a conclusion; however, the team declined to make such an offer. Feliz declined salary arbitration, instead filing for free agency.

Philadelphia Phillies

On January 31, 2008, Feliz signed a two-year deal with the Philadelphia Phillies. The Giants had offered Feliz more guaranteed money, but Feliz felt alienated by the Giants' demeanor during contract negotiations. In 2008, struggling with an inflamed lower back, Feliz's power declined from previous seasons, but on October 29, 2008, he delivered one of the most important base hits in Phillies history, when he knocked in Eric Bruntlett, to plate the winning run, in Philadelphia's Game 5, World Series-clinching win over the Tampa Bay Rays.

On November 8, 2009, Philadelphia management declined to exercise Feliz's option for the  season, thereby making him a free agent, once again.

Houston Astros

On December 10, 2009, Feliz signed a free agent, $4 million, 1-year deal, with the Houston Astros.

St. Louis Cardinals

On August 19, 2010, the Astros traded Feliz to the St. Louis Cardinals, in exchange for cash considerations and pitcher David Carpenter.

Kansas City Royals

On February 3, 2011, Feliz was signed to a Minor League Baseball (MiLB) deal by the Kansas City Royals, with an invitation to Spring Training. On March 27, he was released.

Minor leagues redux

Feliz signed with the Camden Riversharks in the independent leagues on May 13, 2011. On August 10, 2011, Feliz signed a minor league contract with the San Diego Padres and was assigned to the Triple-A Tucson Padres. Pedro returned to the Riversharks for the 2012 season.

Personal life
Feliz and his wife Niurka Mateo were married in December 2002. They have 3 daughters and one son

References

External links

Pedro Feliz at Astros Daily

1975 births
Living people
Arizona League Giants players
Bakersfield Blaze players
Baseball players at the 2015 Pan American Games
Bellingham Giants players
Burlington Bees players
Camden Riversharks players
Central American and Caribbean Games bronze medalists for the Dominican Republic
Central American and Caribbean Games medalists in baseball
Clearwater Threshers players
Competitors at the 2014 Central American and Caribbean Games
Dominican Republic expatriate baseball players in the United States
Fresno Grizzlies players
Houston Astros players

Major League Baseball players from the Dominican Republic
Major League Baseball third basemen
Pan American Games competitors for the Dominican Republic
Philadelphia Phillies players
Reading Phillies players
San Francisco Giants players
Shreveport Captains players
St. Louis Cardinals players
Tucson Padres players
World Baseball Classic players of the Dominican Republic
2006 World Baseball Classic players
2015 WBSC Premier12 players
Gigantes del Cibao players
Leones del Escogido players
Toros del Este players